The 1952 Maine gubernatorial election took place on September 8, 1952. Incumbent Republican Governor Frederick G. Payne was term limited and seeking election to the United States Senate, thus did not run.  Maine Senate President Burton M. Cross faced off against Democratic challenger, former Congressman James C. Oliver (who served in Congress as a Republican) and Independent Neil Bishop in the general election, easily defeating both men.  Burton's election was the ninth consecutive victory for the Republicans in Maine gubernatorial races.

The period after the election itself was rather unusual.  Cross actually became Governor about two weeks prior to the start of his elected term of office – the outgoing Governor, Frederick G. Payne had resigned on December 25, 1952, to prepare for his term in the United States Senate.  Cross, as President of the Senate became Governor through constitutional succession. Cross himself resigned as Senate President (and Governor) at 10:00am January 6, 1953 and was replaced for the next 25 hours by Nathaniel Haskell. At 11:00am on January 7, 1953, Cross' official elected term of office began.

Results

Notes

1952
Maine
Gubernatorial
September 1952 events in the United States